Ernst Hofmann (1837 Frankfurt am Main - 1892 Stuttgart) was a German entomologist who specialised in Lepidoptera. He is not to be confused with Ottmar Hofmann also was an entomologist specialising in Lepidoptera. 

Also a zoologist, Ernst Hofmann trained as an apothecary and later became the curator of the Naturalienkabinett in Stuttgart. His collections of Psychidae, Sesiidae, Tortricidae, Tineidae and Pterophoridae are held by Natural History Museum, London. Others (macrolepidoptera) are held by the National Museum of Natural History in Washington. He wrote parts of the multi-volume work Die Schmetterlinge Europas (The Lepidoptera of Europe), published in 1908. This was for decades a standard in the study of Lepidoptera.

References
Groll, E. K. (2017). Biographies of the Entomologists of the World. Online database, version 8. Senckenberg Deutsches Entomologisches Institut, Müncheberg
Schütz, E. & Harde, K. W. (1963). [Hofmann, E.] Stuttgarter Beiträge zur Naturkunde. Serie A (Biologie), Stuttgart 100 (6), 11429

German lepidopterists
1892 deaths
1837 births
19th-century German zoologists
Apothecaries
German curators